Sushi Roku is an upscale American sushi chain restaurant. Michael Cardenas, former Matsuhisa general manager, teamed with nightclub owners on Santa Monica's Sushi Roku, starting the "sushi lounge" trend.

History

Sushi Roku opened its first location in Santa Monica, California in 1997 and includes locations in Pasadena, Newport Beach, and Scottsdale, Arizona. It opened a Las Vegas, Nevada location in 2004.

Sushi Roku is a subsidiary of Innovative Dining Group (IDG).

In popular culture
Sushi Roku was mentioned in the 2004 Academy Award-nominated film Sideways, by actor Thomas Haden Church's character in a scene at The Hitching Post II.

See also
 List of sushi restaurants

References

External links
Innovative Dining Group

Restaurants established in 1997
Sushi restaurants in the United States
1997 establishments in California
Restaurants in California
Restaurants in Orange County, California
Restaurants in Arizona
Restaurants in Las Vegas, Nevada